is the name for two different railway stations in the city of Kasugai, Aichi Prefecture, Japan. One is operated by Central Japan Railway Company (JR Tōkai) and the other by the Tōkai Transport Service Company (TKJ).

Lines
Kachigawa Station is served by the Chūō Main Line, and is located 381.9 kilometers from the starting point of the line at Tokyo Station and 15.0 kilometers from Nagoya Station. It is also the northern terminus of the TKJ Jōhoku Line and is 11.2 kilometers from the southern terminus at Biwajima Station.

Station layout (JR) 
The JR station has two elevated opposed side platforms with the station building underneath. The station building has automated ticket machines, TOICA automated turnstiles and a staffed ticket office.

Platforms

Station layout (TKJ) 
The TKJ station consists of one elevated side platform located 500 meters to the west of the JR station. The station is unattended with no turnstiles or facilities, but tickets can be purchased from the nearby JR station or fares paid on the train instead.

Platforms

Adjacent stations

|-
!colspan=5|JR Central

|-
!colspan=5|Tōkai Transport Service Company

Station history
Kachigawa Station was opened on 25 July 1900. Along with the division and privatization of JNR on 1 April 1987, the station came under the control and operation of the Central Japan Railway Company. The TKJ Jōhoku Line began operations from 1 December 1991. The tracks were elevated in 2009 and a new JR station building was completed in 2010.

Passenger statistics 
In fiscal 2017, the JR portion of the station was used by an average of 17,579 passengers daily (arriving passengers only) and the TKJ portion by 238.

Surrounding area
Japan National Route 19
Jōjō Castle

References

External links
 
 Kachigawa Station (JR Central) 

Railway stations in Japan opened in 1900
Railway stations in Japan opened in 1991
Railway stations in Aichi Prefecture
Chūō Main Line
Stations of Central Japan Railway Company
Kasugai, Aichi